Muzrabot is a district of Surxondaryo Region in Uzbekistan. The capital lies at Xalqobod.

The district consists of 10 urban-type settlements (Xalqobod, Baxt, Baynalmilal, Guliston, Iftixor, Qozoyoqli, Oq oltin, Taskent, Ozod Vatan, Chegarachi) and 9 rural communities (Beshqoʻton, Boldir, Sarhad, Qorakamar, Sharq yulduzi, Muzrabot, Navbahor, Obodon, Shoʻrob).

References 

Districts of Uzbekistan
Surxondaryo Region